Bobby Patterson may refer to:

 Bobby Patterson (musician) (born 1944), American musician, singer-songwriter and record producer
 Bobby Patterson (surfer) (born 1935), American surfer

See also
 Robert Patterson (disambiguation)
 Bob Patterson (disambiguation)